Daniel José Pereira Mestre (born 1 April 1986) is a Portuguese cyclist, who last rode for UCI Continental team .

On 4 October 2022, he received a three-year ban by UCI for doping.

Major results
2014
 1st Stage 2 Tour du Maroc
 5th Overall Volta ao Alentejo
2016
 Volta a Portugal
1st Stages 1 & 9
2017
 1st Stage 3 Troféu Joaquim Agostinho
2018
 1st Clássica Aldeias do Xisto
 8th Overall Vuelta a Castilla y León
 9th Overall GP Beiras e Serra da Estrela
2019
 1st Stage 3 Volta a Portugal
2021 
 5th Overall Volta ao Alentejo
1st Stage 4

See also
 Doping in sport
 List of doping cases in cycling

References

External links

1986 births
Living people
Portuguese male cyclists
European Games competitors for Portugal
Cyclists at the 2019 European Games
People from Almodôvar
Sportspeople from Beja District
Doping cases in cycling